Proud Flesh Soothseer is a 1968 album by Linn County. The album predominantly features lengthy blues rock and psychedelic rock jams typical of its era. It barely sold and didn't chart. Cave Song was co-written by the band's previous bassist Bob Miskimen, despite him not being featured on the album.

In October 2011, the album was given its first reissue on CD, and remains the only album by Linn County that is currently in print.

Track listing
Side 1
 "Think" (L. Pauling) - 3:31
 "Lower Lemons" (S. Miller, L. Easter, F. Walk) - 4:06
 "Moon Food" (S. Miller, L. Easter, F. Walk, D. Long) - 6:30
 "Cave Song" (S. Miller, B. Miskimen) - 4:28
Side 2
 "Protect & Serve/Bad Things" (S. Miller, L. Easter, F. Walk) - 14:12
 "Fast Days" (S. Miller, F. Walk) - 6:44

Personnel
Stephen Miller: Organ, Vocals
Fred Walk: Guitar, Electric Sitar
Dino Long: Bass guitar
Larry Easter: Tenor Saxophone, Soprano Saxophone, Flute
Jerry 'Snake' McAndrew: Percussion

Production
Produced by John Cabalka and Abe Kesh
Engineered by Hank Cicalo
Arrangements by Shorty Rodgers

References 

1968 albums
Linn County (band) albums